The Chyornaya Rechka, originally Mustajogi (in the Karelian language), is a small river in Saint Petersburg. It is 8.1 kilometres long, and flows into the Great Nevka, a branch of the Neva.

The Chyornaya Rechka is known for famous duels that took place there, including the 1909 duel between Nikolai Gumilyov and Maximilian Voloshin over the matter of a fictitious poet called Cherubina de Gabriak [in the Finnish language: Kaprijakin (Kaprion) Kerubitar], and the fatal duel between poet-playwright Alexander Pushkin and Georges d'Anthès. The Chyornaya Rechka contributes to St. Petersburg's weather - since water absorbs and radiates heat slower than land it makes temperatures less extreme in a place so close to the polar zone.

References 

Rivers of Saint Petersburg
Tributaries of the Neva